The Campeonato Panamericano de Clubes de Básquetbol (English: Pan American Basketball Club Championship) was an international professional basketball tournament that was contested from 1993 to 2000, with the exception of 1998, when it was scheduled to be held in the Dominican Republic, and was cancelled due to Hurricane Georges. The team that won the most championships was Franca Basquetebol Clube, with 4 titles.

This tournament was a predecessor of the current FIBA Americas League, that was created in 2007.

History
The Pan American Club Championship, founded in 1993, was the top-tier level annual professional basketball competition for all of Latin America. It was not held in 1998, due to Hurricane Georges. The competition's last season was held in 2000. A new version of the Pan American Club Championship, called the FIBA Americas League, was created in 2007 and it was then replaced by the BCL in 2019.

Names of the top-tier level Pan-American competition
 Campeonato Panamericano de Clubes de Básquetbol (English: Pan American Basketball Club Championship): (1993–2000)
FIBA Americas era: (2007–present)
 FIBA Americas League: (2007 – 2019)
 Basketball Champions League Americas: (2019 - present)

Championship results

Champions

Titles by club

Titles by country

Rosters

1994 Final
Cougar Franca: Maury, Chuí, Dexter Shouse, Rogério Klafke, Fábio Pira - Demétrius Conrado Ferraciú, Janjao. Coach: Hélio Rubens
Olimpia: Héctor Campana, Alejandro Montecchia, Jorge Racca, Lucas Victoriano, Sebastian Uranga, Gabriel Darrás, Orlando Tourn, Orlando Lightfoot, George Montgomery, Leonardo Gutiérrez. Coach: Julio Lamas

1995 Final
Rio Claro: Valtinho da Silva, Scooby Tec, Taddei Cury, Paulao, Antonio Santana, Luiz Felipe Azevedo, Almir, Gibi, Daniel Ricardo Probst, Efigenio, Seu Agostinho, Walter Rosamila, Gustavo
Penarol: Marcelo Richotti, Ariel Bernardini , Héctor Campana, Diego Maggi, Pablo Sebastián Rodríguez. Coach: Néstor García

1996 Final
Atenas Cordoba: Marcelo Milanesio, Greg Dennis, Wallace Bryant, Fabricio Oberto, Diego Osella - Héctor Campana, Bruno Lábaque, Leandro Palladino, Alejandro Olivares. Coach: Rubén Magnano
Cougar Franca: Helinho, Demétrius Conrado Ferraciú, Ronnie Thompkins, Rogério Klafke, Jose Vargas, Isaías, Fernando Reis, Evandro. Coach: Hélio Rubens

1997 Final
Cougar Franca: Helinho, Chui, Demétrius Conrado Ferraciú, Rogério Klafke, Jose Vargas, Fabio Pira, Evandro, Ricardo Giannecchini, Guillherme da Luz, Serafin. Coach: Hélio Rubens
Atenas Cordoba: Bruno Lábaque, Leandro Palladino 
Steve Edwards, Stephen Rich, Fabricio Oberto - Marcelo Milanesio, Diego Osella, Héctor Campana, Gabriel Riofrio, Pellusi. Coach: Rubén Magnano

1999 Final
Cougar Franca: Helinho, Chui, Sandro Varejao, Guillherme da Luz, Gilsinho, Mike Higgins, Rodrigo Bahia, Fernando Reis, Fransergio, Ricardo Giannecchini, Valtinho da Silva, Edu Mineiro, Jorginho, Marcio Dornelles. Coach: Hélio Rubens
Vasco da Gama: 
Demétrius Conrado Ferraciú, Paulinho, Jose Vargas, Charles Byrd, Janjao, Mingao, Joao Batista, Rogerio, Diego, Espiga, Ricardinho. Coach: Flor Meléndez

2000 Final
Estudiantes de Olavarria: Gustavo Fernández, Daniel Farabello, Gabriel Díaz, Dwight McGray, Gabriel Fernández - Byron Wilson, Victor Baldo, Paolo Quinteros. Coach: Sergio Hernandez 

Aguada: Jorge Cabrera, Diego Losada, Sterling Davis, Bill Washington, Fredy Navarrete, Hébert Núñez, Diego Castrillón, González. Coach: Alberto Espasandín

See also 
 FIBA Americas League
 Basketball Champions League Americas 
 FIBA South American League
 South American Championship of Champions Clubs

Sources
1999 Tournament
2000 Tournament
1994 Olimpia
Historical standings

References

External links
FIBA Americas Official Website

1993 establishments in South America
Basketball competitions in the Americas
Basketball leagues in South America
Defunct basketball leagues
International club basketball competitions